The 1934 All-Ireland Minor Football Championship was the sixth staging of the All-Ireland Minor Football Championship, the Gaelic Athletic Association's premier inter-county Gaelic football tournament for boys under the age of 18.

Kerry entered the championship as defending champions, however, they were beaten by Tipperary in the Munster semi-final.

Tipperary, who defeated Mayo in the All-Ireland semi-final on 9 September 1934, were declared the champions as the other semi-finalists,
Dublin and Tyrone, were disqualified. This was their first All-Ireland title.

Results

Connacht Minor Football Championship

Leinster Minor Football Championship

Munster Minor Football Championship

Ulster Minor Football Championship

All-Ireland Minor Football Championship
Semi-Finals

Final
Tipperary awarded.

References

1934
All-Ireland Minor Football Championship